Johannes Brahms' String Sextet No. 2 in G major, Opus 36 was composed during the years of 1864–1865 (although it drew on material from earlier times) and published by the firm of Fritz Simrock.
It was first performed in Boston, Massachusetts on October 11, 1866, with the European premiere following the next month in Zurich.

The work is scored for two violins, two violas, and two celli, and has four movements:

Brahms did most of the composition in the comfortable country surroundings of Lichtental, near Baden-Baden. According to Brahms' biographer Karl Geiringer, it conceals a reference to the first name of Agathe von Siebold (with whom he was infatuated at the time) in the first movement, bars 162–168, with the notes a-g-a-h-e.

It is characterized by the exotic-sounding opening of its first movement, by innovative chord structures, and by its many contrasts, both technical and melodic.

Arrangements
Brahms himself arranged the work for piano four-hands. Theodor Kirchner arranged it for piano trio. Swedish composer Kurt Atterberg arranged the sextet for string orchestra in 1939.

Popular culture
The first movement of this sextet is prominent in the last sequence of Bertrand Blier's 1979 film Buffet froid.

References

External links

Recording by the Borromeo String Quartet with violist Liz Freivogel and cellist Daniel McDonough from the Isabella Stewart Gardner Museum in MP3 format

Chamber music by Johannes Brahms
1865 compositions
Brahms Sextet 2
Compositions in G major